Atelothrus debilis is a species of beetle first discovered in 1917. No sub-species are listed in the Catalogue of Life.

References

Carabidae
Beetles described in 1917